Hundleton is a village and a community in Pembrokeshire, Wales, in the parish of Monkton. The community covers the adjacent settlements of West Orielton, Brownslate, Corston and Pwllcrochan.

Amenities
Hundleton village contains a chapel, a restaurant, a public house and several bed and breakfast houses.

Amenities include a park, playing area and football and cricket area and a mother and toddler group.

Governance
An electoral ward in the same name also exists. This ward covers the whole peninsula with a total population taken at the 2011 census of 1,877.

Orielton

Orielton is a historic country house dating from the 18th century. From 1963 until 2022 it was used as a field studies centre by the Field Studies Council. The house and the nearby Orielton Banqueting Tower are grade II* listed buildings.

References

Villages in Pembrokeshire
Communities in Pembrokeshire